JAC Recording, Inc., was a small American recording studio based in New York City at 152 West 58th Street.  It was founded in the 1950s by Charles Leighton, a virtuoso classical and jazz harmonica player, who, in the 1950s, took on Jack Arnold as a partner, who also was a pianist.  The JAC acronym stood for "Jack and Charlie."  The studio was Leighton's personal residence — apartment 8D.

Phil Ramone, a prolific recording engineer, entrepreneur, founder, and co-owner of A & R Recording Inc., was first mentored in the art of studio engineering by Leighton at JAC in the late 1950s.  Ramone had left JAC in 1958 to start his own recording studio with the help of Jack Arnold, as partner. The "A & R" stood for Arnold and Ramone.

History 
The early years of JAC were devoted to jingles and demos.  In the early 1980s, Leighton began recording jazz and blues artist.

External links 
 Biography of Charlies Leighton, Mega Mouth Records, Bridgeport, Connecticut

Selected recording artists 

 Lew Anderson (1983)
 Phil Bodner
 Walter Bolden
 Frank Capp
 Buck Clayton
 Jimmy Cobb
 Hank Crawford
 Dardanelle Hadley
 (née Marcia Marie Mullen; 1917–1997)
 George Duvivier
 Helen Forrest
 Morgana King
 Peggy King
 Gene Krupa
 Junior Mance
 George Masso
 Butch Miles
 Anne Marie Moss
 David "Fathead" Newman
 Joe Newman
 New York Saxophone Quartet
 Ray Beckenstein
 Dennis Anderson
 Billy Kerr
 Wally Kane
 Red Norvo
 Mary Osborne
 Charlie Persip
 Bucky Pizzarelli
 Jimmy Ponder
 Carmel Quinn
 Martin Rivera
 Jimmy Rowles
 Sara Rubine
 Neil Sedaka
 Herbie Steward
 Slam Stewart
 Sonny Stitt (1982)
 Marlene VerPlanck
 Eddie Cleanhead Vinson (1982)
 Bill Watrous (1983)
 Carla White

 Audio drama

 Flash Gordon, Vols. 1 & 2, Wonderland Records (1979)

Videos of Charles Leighton playing harmonica 
 Flight of the Bumble Bee (Cappy Lafell, soloist; Leighton is part of the ensemble)
 Cappy Barra Boys Harmonica Quartet from the 1945 film, Rockin' in the Rockies
 Tuesdays at Charlie Leighton's with Will Galison, Charlie Spranklin, Randy Weinstein, and Rob Paparozzi

Affiliated audio engineers 
 Jack Arnold
 Don Frey
 Charles Leighton
 Phil Ramone
 Bill Schwartau (né William H. Schwartau; 1926–1985) (appointed Chief Engineer at A & R Recording, December 1958)

References 

Recording studios in Manhattan